|}

The Carlingford Stakes is a Listed flat horse race in Ireland open to thoroughbreds aged three years or older. It is run at Dundalk over a distance of 1 mile, 2 furlongs and 150 yards (2,149 metres), and it is scheduled to take place each year in October.

The race was first run in 2007.

Winners

See also
 Horse racing in Ireland
 List of Irish flat horse races

References
 Racing Post:
 , 

Flat races in Ireland
Open middle distance horse races
Dundalk Stadium
2007 establishments in Ireland
Recurring sporting events established in 2007